Hightower is a surname which may refer to:

People
 Bill Hightower (born 1959), American politician in Alabama
 Brandon Hightower (born 1998), American professional stock car racing driver
 Caroline Warner Hightower (born 1935), American development consultant
 Chelsie Hightower (born 1989), American ballroom dancer
 Cullen Hightower (1923–2008), American author of quips and quotes
 Dennis Hightower (born 1941), American army officer and former U.S. Deputy Secretary of Commerce
 Dick Hightower (1930–2007), American football player
 Dont'a Hightower (born 1990), American football player
 George Robert Hightower (fl. early 20th century), American academic, president of the Mississippi Agricultural and Mechanical College
 Grace Hightower, American actress, singer, wife of actor Robert De Niro
 Jack Hightower (1926–2013), American politician
 James Robert Hightower (1915–2006), American professor of Chinese at Harvard University
 Jim Hightower (born 1943), American activist and commentator
 John Hightower (disambiguation), multiple people
 Keith Hightower (born 1957), American politician
 Lee Hightower (born 1993), American football player
 Loren Hightower (1927–2017), American ballet and musical theater dancer
 Monteria Hightower, American librarian
 Ron Hightower (born 1966), American film director and former pornographic actor
 Rosella Hightower (1920–2008), American ballerina
 Rosetta Hightower (1944–2014), American singer
 Scott Hightower (born 1952), American poet and teacher
 Theresa Hightower (c. 1954–2018), American jazz singer
 Tim Hightower (born 1986), American football player
 Tommy Hightower, American retired football coach
 Yolanda Hightower, American field hockey player at the 1988 Summer Olympics

Fictional characters
 Bob Hightower, in the 1949 western film 3 Godfathers, played by John Wayne
 Reverend Gail Hightower, in the novel Light in August (1932) by William Faulkner
 Harrison Hightower III, in Tokyo DisneySea Version of The Twilight Zone Tower of Terror Disney ride
 Madeleine Hightower, in the TV series The Mentalist
 Moses Hightower (character), in the film and series Police Academy
 Reno Hightower, in The Best of Times (1986), played by Kurt Russell
 Steve Hightower, in the TV series The Steve Harvey Show, played by Steve Harvey
 Wes Hightower, in the film Urban Cowboy (1980), portrayed by Scott Glenn
 Sheriff Hightower, in the 1990 film Flashback
 Alicent Hightower, in the TV series House of the Dragon

See also
 Senator Hightower (disambiguation)